Rowell's Syndrome was described by Professor Neville Rowell and colleagues in 1963. Patients with the syndrome have lupus erythematosus (discoid or systemic), annular lesions of the skin like erythema multiforme associated with a characteristic pattern of immunological abnormalities. It is uncommon but occurs worldwide.

Rowell's syndrome has been reported to occur with all subtypes of LE (systemic, acute, subacute or discoid).

See also 
 Childhood discoid lupus erythematosus
 List of cutaneous conditions

References

Bibliography
 
 
 
 

Cutaneous lupus erythematosus